Tin Tsz Estate is a public housing estate in Tin Shui Wai, New Territories, Hong Kong near Light Rail Tin Tsz stop. It consists of four residential buildings completed in 1997 and contains 3,400 rental flats of sizes ranging from 12.8 to 43.3m2.

Tin Lai Court is a Home Ownership Scheme court in Tin Shui Wai, near Tin Tsz Estate. It has only one Harmony-typed block built in 1997.

Houses

Tin Tsz Estate

Tin Lai Court

Demographics
According to the 2016 by-census, Tin Tsz Estate had a population of 9,026. The median age was 43.4 and the majority of residents (96 per cent) were of Chinese ethnicity. The average household size was 2.8 people. The median monthly household income of all households (i.e. including both economically active and inactive households) was HK$22,000.

Politics
Tin Tsz Estate and Tin Lai Court are located in Tsz Yau constituency of the Yuen Long District Council. It is currently represented by May Chan Mei-lin, who was elected in the 2019 elections.

See also

Public housing estates in Tin Shui Wai

References

Residential buildings completed in 1997
Tin Shui Wai
Public housing estates in Hong Kong